The grey dwarf hamster, grey hamster or migratory hamster (Cricetulus migratorius) is a species of rodent in the family Cricetidae. Its range extends from Eastern Europe through the Middle East, Russia and Central Asia to Mongolia and western China. The International Union for Conservation of Nature has assessed its conservation status as being of "least concern".

Description
It is a sandy brownish-grey colour above with whitish underparts, the white hairs often having gray bases. The ears are large and the skull flattened with a narrow rostrum.

Distribution
The grey dwarf hamster is found in parts of Eastern Europe and Asia including Afghanistan, Armenia, Bulgaria, China, Iran, Iraq, Israel, Jordan, Kazakhstan, Lebanon, Moldova, Mongolia, Pakistan, Romania, Russia, Turkey, and Ukraine. It has been recorded from Greece but has not been seen there since about 1970. It originally inhabited dry grasslands, arid steppes and semi-deserts, but it has spread into cultivated land and gardens, and even sometimes into buildings. It avoids moist locations, dense woodland and forests and is most common in sparsely-vegetated areas.

Behaviour
The grey dwarf hamster is active at dusk and at night. It digs a deep burrow complex that may extend  beneath the surface of the ground and which includes side passages, several nesting areas and chambers to store food for use in winter. It forages for roots, the green parts of plants and seeds, and also eats insects. It does not hibernate, breeding taking place during the summer, with up to three litters being produced annually. Litter size is usually six or seven, but ranges from one to thirteen.

Status
The grey dwarf hamster has a very wide range and a large total population. In some areas such as the Balkans, it is rare but in others it is abundant, being more common than the house mouse (Mus musculus) in Armenia and Kyrgyzstan. The population trend is unknown, but no particular threats have been identified and it is present in many protected areas. The International Union for Conservation of Nature has therefore assessed this hamster's conservation status as being of "least concern".

References

Musser, G. G. and M. D. Carleton. 2005. Superfamily Muroidea. pp. 894–1531 in Mammal Species of the World a Taxonomic and Geographic Reference. D. E. Wilson and D. M. Reeder eds. Johns Hopkins University Press, Baltimore.

Cricetulus
Hamster, grey dwarf
Hamster, grey dwarf
Mammals of Azerbaijan
Mammals of Afghanistan
Mammals of Pakistan
Hamster, grey dwarf
Mammals described in 1773
Taxonomy articles created by Polbot